Thomas-Jean Bourque (May 11, 1864 – February 16, 1952) was a physician and political figure in New Brunswick, Canada. Born in Memramcook, he came to represent Kent County in the Legislative Assembly of New Brunswick from 1908 to 1916 as a Conservative member. Bourque went on to serve in the Senate of Canada from 1917 to 1952 representing Richibucto division.

Bourque died in office at the age of 87.

References 
 

1864 births
1952 deaths
Canadian senators from New Brunswick
Conservative Party of Canada (1867–1942) senators
Progressive Conservative Party of New Brunswick MLAs